Malishka Mendonsa, popularly known as RJ Malishka, is an Indian radio personality. She participated in the YouTube  Originals series Pretty Fit hosted by Prajakta Koli. Malishka hosts Morning No. 1 with Malishka on the Red FM 93.5 radio station.

Biography

Early life 
Malishka was born and brought up in Mumbai, India. She completed her schooling at St. Charles High School. Having lost her father at an early age, she was raised by her mother Lily Mendonsa. She graduated with a Bachelor of Arts degree in political science from St. Xavier College, University of Mumbai. After a year break, she did her Master of Arts in Mass Communication at Sophia College, University of Mumbai.

Career 
Malishka started her career as a radio jockey. Her Red FM 93.5 show "Morning No 1 with Malishka", in particular, won the "Best Breakfast Programme/Show (Hindi) at the Indian Excellence in Radio Awards" in 2010. She has also done shows like Best Breakfast Programme and M Bole Toh. On 13 July 2014, Malishka entered the dance reality show Jhalak Dikhhla Jaa 7 as a wild card contestant but was eliminated in the 9th week of the program.  Bollywood actress Vidya Balan was trained by Malishka for playing the role of an RJ in the 2006 Bollywood film Lage Raho Munnabhai. She later played the role of a radio jockey in the 2017 Bollywood film Tumhari Sulu starring Vidya Balan.

Malishka published a song on YouTube about Mumbai's monsoon problems people face every year, including potholes, traffic jams, and railway disruptions. The song was themed around the question "Mumbai, do you trust the BMC?" and referred to the Brihanmumbai Municipal Corporation (BMC). With the success of the song, in 2018, she published a new song targeting the BMC. Subsequently, in 2019, the BMC invited Malishka for road inspection where she was explained about the functioning of the civic body and how it takes up efforts to maintain the city roads during the monsoons.

In 2020, she participated in Fear Factor: Khatron Ke Khiladi 10; she was eliminated in the 4th week of the program.

Dubbing roles

Live action films

Animated films

As actress

Filmography

Television

Web series

References

External links
 
 Website http://rjmalishka.com

Indian women radio presenters
Indian radio presenters
Artists from Mumbai
Living people
Year of birth missing (living people)
Fear Factor: Khatron Ke Khiladi participants